Iziumske is a village in Izium Raion, Kharkiv Oblast (province) of Ukraine.

Iziumske was previously located in the Borova Raion. The raion was abolished on 18 July 2020 as part of the administrative reform of Ukraine, which reduced the number of raions of Kharkiv Oblast to seven. The area of Borova Raion was merged into Izium Raion.

References

Villages in Izium Raion